Harpalus rumelicus is a species of ground beetle in the subfamily Harpalinae. It was described by Apfelbeck in 1904.

References

rumelicus
Beetles described in 1904